Ariana DeBose (born January 25, 1991) is an American actress, dancer, and singer. She has received various accolades, including an Academy Award, a British Academy Film Award, a Golden Globe Award, and a nomination for a Tony Award. In 2022, Time magazine named her one of the 100 most influential people in the world.

DeBose made her television debut competing on the sixth season of So You Think You Can Dance in 2009, where she finished in the top 20. She then made her Broadway debut in Bring It On: The Musical in 2011 and continued her work on Broadway with roles in Motown: The Musical (2013) and Pippin (2014). From 2015 to 2016, she originated the role of The Bullet in Lin-Manuel Miranda's musical Hamilton, and appeared as Jane in A Bronx Tale (2016–2017). In 2018, she was nominated for the Tony Award for Best Featured Actress in a Musical for her performance as Disco Donna in Summer: The Donna Summer Musical. In 2022, she hosted the 75th Tony Awards.

DeBose appeared in the Netflix musical film The Prom (2020) and the Apple TV+ musical comedy series Schmigadoon! (2021), before gaining widespread recognition for her role as Anita in Steven Spielberg's musical West Side Story (2021). For her performance, she won the Academy Award for Best Supporting Actress, making her the first queer woman of color to receive an Oscar in an acting category.

Early life
DeBose was born on January 25, 1991, in Wilmington, North Carolina. Her mother, Gina DeBose, is an eighth grade teacher. DeBose trained in dance at CC & Co. Dance Complex in Raleigh. DeBose has stated that her father is Puerto Rican and her mother is white. She also has African American and partial Italian ancestry.

Career

Early work and Broadway roles (2009–2016)
DeBose made her television debut in 2009, when she competed on the TV series So You Think You Can Dance, making it into the Top 20. She later appeared on the soap opera One Life to Live and played Inez in the North Carolina Theatre's production of Hairspray before appearing in the role of Nautica in the 2011 Alliance Theatre production of Bring It On. She also appeared in the ensemble of the New York Philharmonic production of Company, which was filmed for television. At the end of 2011, Bring It On embarked on a national tour across the United States. DeBose continued her role into the 2012 Broadway production and understudied the character Danielle.

In 2013, DeBose played Mary Wilson in Motown on Broadway, understudying the role of Diana Ross. She later joined the cast of Pippin on Broadway, playing a noble and a player and understudying the role of the Leading Player, which she ended up taking over for a short period in 2014. She can be heard playing director/choreographer Zoey Taylor in As the Curtain Rises, an original Broadway soap opera podcast from the Broadway Podcast Network.

In 2015, DeBose left Pippin to join the ensemble of the off-Broadway musical Hamilton. The show moved to Broadway later that year. She left Hamilton in July 2016 and made a guest appearance on the TV series Blue Bloods as Sophia Ortiz. She also starred as Daphne in the thriller film Seaside. From November 2016 to August 2017, DeBose portrayed Jane on Broadway in A Bronx Tale.

Breakthrough and critical success (2017–present)
In late 2017, DeBose received her breakthrough role, playing Disco Donna in Summer: The Donna Summer Musical at San Diego's La Jolla Playhouse. She reprised this role in the Broadway production, which opened in April 2018. She was nominated for the 2018 Tony Award for Best Featured Actress in a Musical.

DeBose played Alyssa Greene in the film adaptation of The Prom, directed by Ryan Murphy, where she was opposite of Jo Ellen Pellman as Emma Nolan. In March 2021, DeBose released a dance-pop recording and video of Rodgers & Hammerstein's "Shall We Dance" for the album R&H Goes Pop, produced by Justin Goldner and arranged by Benjamin Rauhala. In 2021, DeBose played Emma Tate in the parody musical comedy series Schmigadoon! on Apple TV+. She will also star in the spy film Argylle for the service.

Despite initially not seeing herself playing the role and refusing to audition for it, DeBose played Anita in the 2021 film adaptation of the musical West Side Story, directed by Steven Spielberg. The film was released in December 2021 to critical acclaim. DeBose herself received critical attention for her performance of Anita, with Caryn James of BBC praising her performance, declaring, "Anita, in a layered, dynamic performance by Ariana DeBose, is the centre of attention, swirling her skirt and dancing to the Latin rhythms that infuse the film." David Fear of Rolling Stone wrote, "DeBose...strong contender for Most Valuable Player here, whose energy—in her singing, her dancing, her line-reading, her side-eyeing—could power a metropolitan block." She also received multiple accolades, including a Golden Globe Award, a BAFTA Award, a Critics' Choice Movie Award, and a Screen Actors Guild Award, making her the first Afro-Latina and queer woman of color to win the latter award, and the Academy Award for Best Supporting Actress.

Following her West Side Story success, it was announced that DeBose would host the 75th Tony Awards. DeBose called the opportunity to host "a bucket list moment" that "I didn't know I had." She received generally positive reviews for the show.

DeBose will next star in the upcoming science-fiction thriller I.S.S.. She will also appear in the upcoming superhero film Kraven the Hunter, directed by J.C. Chandor. She also made a recurring appearance in the fourth season of the HBO science fiction series Westworld.

DeBose will also voice the character Asha in the 2023 Disney animated film, Wish.

DeBose went viral on Twitter after performing at the 76th British Academy Film Awards, where she celebrated the female nominees by name in an original freestyle rap performance. Despite being described by Variety as “a little out of breath at some points” and that the lyrics “felt clumsy”, show producer Nick Bullen defended the performance, claiming it was well-received by the live audience and that the criticism was “incredibly unfair” and he "absolutely loved it".

Personal life 
DeBose identifies as queer and came out to her grandparents in 2015.

In December 2020, DeBose and Pellman launched the Unruly Hearts Initiative. The initiative was created to help young people connect with organizations and charities that advocate for the LGBTQ+ community.

DeBose is in a relationship with costume designer and professor Sue Makkoo. The pair met while working on Summer: The Donna Summer Musical in 2017. Previously, DeBose was in a romantic relationship with theater props master Jill Johnson. The pair met while both were working on the musical Motown: The Musical.

Filmography

Film

Television

Theater

Awards and nominations

In 2022, at the 94th Academy Awards, DeBose won Best Supporting Actress for her role of Anita in Steven Spielberg's 2021 adaptation of West Side Story, the second film adaptation of the 1957 stage musical of the same name. The achievement made DeBose the first Afro-Latina and first openly queer woman of color to win an Academy Award for acting. Additionally, with her win following Rita Moreno's 1962 win in the same category for West Side Story (1961), made DeBose and Moreno the third pair of actors to win an Academy Award for playing the same character in different films. DeBose also became the second Hispanic performer to win Best Supporting Actress and the first in 30 years, after Mercedes Ruehl (The Fisher King, 1991), and to this date, she remains one of only five actors of Hispanic background to win an acting Oscar. That year, DeBose also won the BAFTA, Critics' Choice, Golden Globe and SAG Awards for Best Supporting Actress for the role.

In 2018, DeBose was nominated for the Tony Award for Best Featured Actress in a Musical for her role in Summer: The Donna Summer Musical. In 2022, DeBose became the twenty-first American actor to be nominated for the BAFTA Rising Star Award.

References

External links
Official website

Living people
1991 births
21st-century American actresses
21st-century American dancers
21st-century American women singers
Actresses from North Carolina
African-American actresses
African-American female dancers
21st-century African-American women singers
American actresses of Puerto Rican descent
American musical theatre actresses
American television actresses
American voice actresses
Best Supporting Actress BAFTA Award winners
Best Supporting Actress Golden Globe (film) winners
LGBT people from North Carolina
American queer actresses
21st-century American singers
21st-century American LGBT people
Best Supporting Actress Academy Award winners
LGBT African Americans
LGBT dancers
LGBT Hispanic and Latino American people
Dancers from North Carolina
Outstanding Performance by a Female Actor in a Supporting Role Screen Actors Guild Award winners